Acanthopriapulus is a genus of priapulids belonging to the family Priapulidae.

Species:
 Acanthopriapulus horridus (Théel, 1911)

References

Priapulida